Tuff Laxmi Prasad Sports Club or TLP SC is an Indian professional football club based in Mapusa, Goa. The club currently competes in the Goa Professional League and participated in the Durand Cup.

History
First, in 2012, the team made a leap from the Goa second division to the Goa first division and now from first they are promoted to the competitive Goa Professional League. Laxmi Prasad have remained unbeaten throughout the two-season spell, which maybe considered as a record in itself.

At one time, Laxmi Prasad were regarded as a team that was satisfied with the second division tag. The club has been in the second division league for a major portion of their 36 years of existence. Laxmi Prasad featured in the Professional League several years back when the league was still called senior division league.
Laxmi Prasad SC won Bangalore championship 2020.

Honours

Cup
 Goa Police Cup
Champions (1): 2015

See also
List of football clubs in Goa

References

Football clubs in Goa
Association football clubs established in 1960
1960 establishments in Portuguese India